The Stabilizer is a 1984 Indonesian action film directed by Arizal, produced by Parkit Film (The Punjabi Brothers) and distributed by Troma Entertainment. The movie stars New Zealand born actor Peter O'Brian who plays Peter Goldson, also known as The Stabilizer. He is an FBI agent who is sent to Thailand to retrieve a brilliant professor who has been captured by the drug lord Greg Rainmaker.

The Stabilizer was also released in the Philippines by Roadshow Films International on September 3, 1987.

References

External links

Review of The Stabilizer at Internal Bleeding

1984 films
1984 action thriller films
1984 independent films
1984 martial arts films
Troma Entertainment films
1980s English-language films